The River Thames in England is a very popular river for kayakers and canoeists, and is home to several canoe clubs, including the Royal Canoe Club which is the oldest canoe club in the world.

The tidal section is used by sea kayakers and experienced tourers. Above Teddington Lock in London the Thames is freshwater, with levels controlled by a series of weirs which are managed by the Environment Agency.

See also
 Artificial whitewater
 Locks and weirs on the River Thames

External links
Thames Valley Freestylers weir levels
Shepperton, the whitewater centre weir levels

Sport on the River Thames
Thames